Wigan railway station may refer to the following railway stations in Wigan, England
Operational stations
Wigan North Western railway station, the main station for long distance services called Wigan from 1838 to 1924.
Wigan Wallgate railway station,  on the Manchester to Kirby and Manchester to Southport lines called Wigan from 1848 to 1924.
Closed stations
Wigan Central railway station, former GC then LNER station from 1892, closed in 1965 and demolished in 1974.
Wigan Chapel Lane railway station, former WBR station, open as Wigan from 1832 to 1838 when it was superseded by Wigan North Western railway station.
Wigan Darlington Street railway station, former WJR station from 1894 to 1892 when it was superseded by Wigan Central railway station.

See also
Wigan station group 
Wigan bus station